The 1990 North American Club Championship, also known as the Pepsi Cup for sponsorship reasons, was a post-season soccer competition contested by the winners from the Canadian Soccer League and the American Professional Soccer League.

Teams

Background
The Maryland Bays of the American Professional Soccer League qualified for the match after having won the inaugural American Professional Soccer League season by defeating the San Francisco Bay Blackhawks 1–1 (4–3 on penalties) in the final just 3 days earlier.

The Vancouver 86ers qualified by winning the 1989 Canadian Soccer League Championship. At the time of the match, the 1990 Canadian Soccer League was still in its semi-finals phase, with Vancouver having just played to a 2–2 draw at the Victoria Vistas in game one.

The Vancouver 86ers were selected to host the match at Swangard Stadium.

Match

Summary
The Vancouver 86ers dominated the first half of the match and took only fourteen minutes to open the scoring, with Domenic Mobilio finding the net after a series of short passes in the offensive end. Vancouver had a great opportunity to double their lead in the thirty-sixth minute after being awarded a penalty kick, however Steve Powers was able to deny Mobilio's second goal with a heroic punch of the ball. Despite the miss, Maryland would concede again four minutes later after Powers was rounded by Dale Mitchell to put Vancouver 2–0 up. This two goal lead did not last for long however, as Maryland's Kevin Sloan was able to exploit a defensive mistake and quickly slotted the ball past 86er goalkeeper, Paul Dolan, to keep them in the game in the forty-fourth minute.

The second half saw a change in both teams' performance, with Maryland looking much more hostile while Vancouver appeared to have lost their composure and intensity. Maryland leveled the game in the sixty-eighth minute courtesy of a Jean Harbor strike. Maryland had several more opportunities to score before full time, most notably when Maryland's John Abe struck the crossbar, and when Vancouver's Vlado Vanis was able to clear a Scott Cook shot off the goal line, but were unable to find a winner as the match went into extra-time.

After escaping defeat during their poor second half performance, Vancouver turned up in extra-time with much more energy, and eventually found the winner with just three minutes remaining as Mobilio scored his second of the match, making up for his first half penalty miss and securing the title for Vancouver.

Details

Result

Aftermath
The Vancouver 86ers continued their winning ways in game 2 of the CSL semi-finals and defeated the Victoria Vistas 6–1 at Swangard Stadium just four days later to advance to the 1990 Canadian Soccer League Final. Vancouver then won their third playoff title following another 6–1 home victory against the Hamilton Steelers, and secured a treble of sorts, having won their, regular season, playoffs, and the North American Club Championship.

The North American Club Championship was not continued after the 1990 season, however a similar competition in 1992 was created as the Professional Cup to determine a North American champion from 3 professional leagues operating in Canada and the United States.

See also
CONCACAF Champions League
1990 North American Nations Cup — A round-robin tournament contested by Canada, Mexico, and the United States, also hosted at Swangard Stadium.

References

North American Club Championship
Canadian Soccer League (1987–1992)
American Professional Soccer League
1990 in Canadian soccer
1990 in American soccer
Sport in Burnaby
Soccer in British Columbia